Alois Sobotka (5 February 1904 – 1 June 1977) was a Czech athlete. He competed for Czechoslovakia in the men's long jump at the 1924 Summer Olympics.

References

External links
 
 

1904 births
1977 deaths
Athletes (track and field) at the 1924 Summer Olympics
Czech male long jumpers
Olympic athletes of Czechoslovakia
People from Uherské Hradiště
Sportspeople from the Zlín Region